Peristarium is a genus of sea snails, marine gastropod mollusks in the family Turbinellidae.

Species
Species within the genus Peristarium include:

 Peristarium aurora (Bayer, 1971)
 Peristarium electra (Bayer, 1971)
 Peristarium merope (Bayer, 1971)
 Peristarium timor (Harasewych, 1983)

References

External links

Turbinellidae